Pietro or Piero Contarini was a Venetian aristocrat and ambassador to James VI and I in London.

Contarini arrived in London in November 1617, and had audiences with King James and Prince Charles. He met Anne of Denmark, who had been unwell, a few days later, and she joked about Spanish policy towards Venice.

Later in December, he went with his chaplain Horatio or Orazio Busino to see the queen at Somerset House, then known as Denmark House. Busino wrote that Anne of Denmark was dressed in pink and gold, with "a farthingale that was four feet wide at the hips". Her hair was dressed in rays or petals, sparsi in giro, so that she resembled a sunflower. Busino described another audience at Somerset House on 28 December, to which Contarini was led through private corridors from the apartments of a lady in waiting to the queen. The lady in waiting carried a candle to light the way in these dark passages. Her gold costume was both "lascivious and ornate". Busino was left behind during Contarini's adventure.

Busino also briefly described Audley End, Theobalds, Greenwich Palace noting the bird house, and Wanstead House. He also composed descriptive essays on life in England, including a short discourse on blood sports. As shown by his description of visiting Somerset House, Orazio Busino had a keen interest in drama and theatre.

In September 1618 Contarini went to Oatlands to see Anne of Denmark. Hunting was rained off. At dinner, Contarini was seated with Alethea Howard, Countess of Arundel, an enthusiast for all things Italian

Contarini wrote a relazione, a description of English affairs in 1618 after returning to Venice. He noted the growing English trade with the East Indies for pepper, cloves, indigo, and silk, commodities which previously were supplied by Venetian merchants. Contarini heard that Anne of Denmark was unhappy because King James spent less time with her. Although it was often said she was a Catholic, her religion was unknown to him.

References

16th-century Venetian people
17th-century Venetian people
Ambassadors of the Republic of Venice to England
Court of James VI and I
House of Contarini